David Lawrence Gumpert (born May 5, 1958), is a former professional baseball player who attended Aquinas College in Grand Rapids, MI before pitching in the Major Leagues from - for the Chicago Cubs, Detroit Tigers, and Kansas City Royals. Gumpert was named Rookie of the Year for the Detroit Tigers in 1983.

He was born in South Haven, Michigan.

After his MLB career, Gumpert coached Bloomingdale High Schools Varsity Baseball team before taking the position of athletic director at South Haven High School in South Haven, Michigan. Gumpert coached Bloomingdale's Varsity Team to a District Championship in 1996, and was inducted into Aquinas College Athletic Hall of Fame as well as South Haven High School's Hall of Fame.

Gumpert currently resides in South Haven, Michigan. He is retired, but remains active in his community, most recently assisting the South Haven Varsity Girls' softball team to district and regional titles (2018).

External links
, or Retrosheet, or Pelota Binaria (Venezuelan Winter League)

1958 births
Living people
Aquinas Saints baseball players
Baseball players from Michigan
Birmingham Barons players
Cardenales de Lara players
American expatriate baseball players in Venezuela
Chicago Cubs players
Detroit Tigers players
Evansville Triplets players
Iowa Cubs players
Kansas City Royals players
Lakeland Tigers players
Major League Baseball pitchers
Major League Baseball replacement players
Omaha Royals players
People from South Haven, Michigan